Boreen Point is a rural locality in the Shire of Noosa, Queensland, Australia. The town of Boreen is located within the locality beside the lake, but the town name is rarely used with Boreen Point being the name in common usage.

Geography

Boreen Point is north of Tewantin on the Sunshine Coast.

One of Boreen Point's major attractions is Lake Cootharaba, a very large, shallow lake that is recognised nationally for its fantastic weather for sailing and windsurfing.  The lake leads from the Noosa River and also up to national parks.

History 
The name comes from an Aboriginal word from the tribes around Moreton Bay which refers to the pathway that led between two bora rings.

In 1987, the historic inn Apollonian Hotel (built 1860s) was relocated from Gympie, Queensland and rebuilt in Boreen Point. It was named after the Greek God Apollo.

Although currently and historically within the local government area of Shire of Noosa, between 2008 and 2013 Boreen Point was within Sunshine Coast Region following a controversial amalgamation of local government areas that was subsequently reversed following a vote by local people to deamalgamate the Shire of Noosa.

Amenities
The Shire of Noosa operates a mobile library service on a weekly schedule in Orchard Avenue.

References

External links

 
 

Suburbs of Noosa Shire, Queensland
Articles containing video clips
Localities in Queensland